John-Paul Duarte (born 13 December 1986) is a Gibraltarian footballer who plays for Gibraltar National League side Mons Calpe and the Gibraltar national team, where he plays as a forward.

Club career
Duarte made his debut in 2006 for Lincoln Red Imps, becoming a regular in the side that dominated football in Gibraltar for over a decade. However, injuries soon cost him a regular place in the side and in 2015 he moved to Manchester 62. Another injury plagued season ensued as Manchester 62 struggled to get out of mid-table, and after one season at the club he moved on to St Joseph's, where his form drastically improved, earning him a recall to the Gibraltar national football team in March 2017. In summer 2019 he joined Bruno's Magpies - he had originally agreed terms with Gibraltar United before reported financial issues hit the club, causing the deal to collapse.

International career

Duarte was first called up to the Gibraltar senior team in February 2014 for friendlies against Faroe Islands and Estonia on 1 and 5 March 2014. He made his international début with Gibraltar on 1 March 2014 in a 4-1 home loss with the Faroe Islands. His second appearance came a 2-0 home loss to Estonia on 5 March 2014.

International statistics

.

Notes

References

External links
 

1987 births
Living people
Gibraltarian footballers
Gibraltar international footballers
Lincoln Red Imps F.C. players
Mons Calpe S.C. players
Manchester 62 F.C. players
St Joseph's F.C. players
Association football forwards
Gibraltar Premier Division players